
Year 422 (CDXXII) was a common year starting on Sunday (link will display the full calendar) of the Julian calendar. At the time, it was known as the Year of the Consulship of Honorius and Theodosius (or, less frequently, year 1175 Ab urbe condita). The denomination 422 for this year has been used since the early medieval period, when the Anno Domini calendar era became the prevalent method in Europe for naming years.

Events 
 By place 
 Roman Empire 
 End of the Roman–Sassanid War: Emperor Theodosius II signs a 100-year peace treaty with Persia after 2 years of war. He agrees to a status quo ante bellum ("the state in which things were before the war"), and both parties guarantee liberty of religion in their territories. 
 March 3 – Theodosius II issues a law to form provisions in peacetime. He instructs landowners leasing towers in the Theodosian Walls to assist with the build-up of emergency goods. Theodosius pays an annual tribute of 350 pounds of gold to the Huns in order to buy peace. 
 Theodosius II receives a statue at Hebdomon, military parade ground on the shores of the Propontis, just outside Constantinople. On its base (fragments are now in the Istanbul Archaeology Museum), an inscription praises him as “everywhere and forever victorious.” 
 The walls of Rome's Flavian Amphitheater (Colosseum) crack during an earthquake.

 Europe 
 The Roman army invades Gaul; they capture and execute the Frankish king Theudemeres with his family.

 Asia 
 Shao Di, age 16, eldest son of Wu Di, succeeds his father as emperor of the Liu Song Dynasty (China).

 By topic 
 Art 
 Petrus, bishop of Illyria, starts construction of the Church of Santa Sabina (approximate date).

 Religion 
 September 4 – Pope Boniface I dies after a 4-year reign that was interrupted for 15 weeks, by the faction of the antipope Eulalius. He is succeeded by Celestine I as the 43rd pope.
 Approximate date – A monastic community is established at the Maijishan Grottoes.

Births 
 August 8 – Casper, ruler of the Maya city of Palenque
 Genevieve, patron saint of Paris (approximate date)
 Licinia Eudoxia, Roman empress (d. 493)

Deaths 
 September 4 – Pope Boniface I
 Abraham of Cyrrhus, Syrian hermit and bishop
 Fa-Hien, Chinese Buddhist monk and traveler (approximate date)
 Theudemeres, king of the Franks (approximate date)
 Wu Di, emperor of the Liu Song Dynasty (b. 363)

References